Kudaka Island (久高島, Japanese: くだかじま, Ryukyuan: Kudaka-shima) is an island in Ryukyu Islands, located in Nanjō, Okinawa Prefecture, Japan and 5.3 kilometers away from Cape Chinen, Nanjō. From Nanjō, Kudaka Island can be reached by high-speed boat in 15 minutes and by ferry in 20 minutes. It is only about three miles off the southeast coast of Okinawa.

Kudaka Island is a slender island running from the northeast to the southwest, with an area of 1.38 square kilometers and a coastline of 7.8 kilometers. The terrain is flat and the highest point is 17.4 meters. The soil of Kudaka Island is terracotta, with poor water retention. In addition, coral reefs are constantly being formed along the coast, resulting in lagoons.

According to the Chūzan Seikan, the Emperor of Heaven ordered Amamikyu, the god of Ryukyu development, to descend on Cape Kapur on Kudaka Island and founded the Ryukyu Islands. Therefore, Kudaka Island is worshipped as a holy place by the Ryukyu people.

References

External links

 Japan Experience on Kudaka Island

Ryukyu Islands